Maria Bińczyk (born 17 September 1983 in Berlin, Germany) is a former competitive Polish/German ice dancer who represented Poland in international competitions. Bińczyk started skating when she was 7 years old at the BSV 92 skating club in Berlin. She skated for Germany with Marco Derpa until the 2001/2002 season. She switched to the Polish national team in 2002, partnering with Michał Tomaszewski. The pair finished third at the 2004 Polish Figure Skating Championships.

Competitive highlights
(with Tomaszewski)

 J = Junior level

(with Derpa)

 J = Junior level

External links
 
 

1983 births
Polish female ice dancers
German female ice dancers
Polish expatriate sportspeople in Germany
Figure skaters from Berlin
Living people